The 1948 Stockholm Grand Prix was a Grand Prix race held according to the then new Formula Two rules, at Skarpnäck Airfield outside Stockholm on 30 May 1948. It was won by B. Bira in a Simca-Gordini T15 entered by Equipe Gordini. At first he was stripped of his victory. This was due to the start, in which Prince Bertil had provided help by push-starting B. Biras car. First a year later, B. Bira was officially acknowledge winner again.

It was the only running of the Stockholm Grand Prix.

References

Stockholm Grand Prix
Auto races in Sweden